Julian Karol Sochocki (February 2, 1842 in Warsaw, Congress Poland, Russian Empire – December 14, 1927 in Leningrad, Soviet Union) was a Russian-Polish mathematician.  His name is sometimes transliterated from Russian in several different ways (e.g. Sokhotski or Sochotski).

Life and work

Sochocki was born in Warsaw under the Russian domination to a Polish family, where he attended state gymnasium. In 1860 he registered at the physico-mathematical department of St Petersburg University. His study there
was interrupted for the period 1860–1865 because of his involvement with Polish patriotic movement: he had to return to Warsaw to escape prosecution.

In 1866 he graduated from the Department of Physics and Mathematics at the University of Saint Petersburg. In 1868 he received his master's degree and in 1873 his doctorate. His master's dissertation, practically the first text in Russian mathematical literature on Cauchy method of residues, was published in 1868. The dissertation itself contains many original grasps, which have been also ascribed to other mathematicians. His doctoral thesis contains the famous Sokhotski–Plemelj theorem.

From 1868 Sochotcki lectured at the St Petersburg university, first as the "privat-docent", from 1882 as an ordinary professor, and from 1893 as a merited professor. In 1894 he was elected corresponding member of the Polish Academy of Arts and Sciences.

Sochocki died on December 14, 1927 in a nursing home in Leningrad.

Sochocki is mainly remembered for the Casorati–Sokhotski–Weierstrass theorem and for the Sokhotski–Plemelj theorem.

Selected publications
 Теорiя интегральныхъ вычетовъ с нѣкоторыми приложенiями (A Theory of Integral Residues with Some Applications) (1868)
 Объ определенныхъ интегралахъ и функцiяхъ употребляемыхъ при разложенiяхъ въ ряды (On Definite Integrals and Functions Used in Series Expansions) (1873)
 О суммахъ Гаусса и о законе взаимности символа Лежандра (On Gauss Sums and the Reciprocity Law of the Legendre Symbol) (1877)
 Высшая алгебра (Higher Algebra) (St. Petersburg, 1882)
 Теорiя чиселъ (Number Theory) (St. Petersburg, 1888)
 Начало общего наибольшего делителя въ применении к теорiи делимости алгебраическихъ чиселъ (The Principle of the Greatest Common Divisor Applied to Divisibility Theory of Algebraic Numbers) (1893),

Notes

External links 
 Yulian Vasilievich Sokhotski (in Russian)
 
 
 Julian Karol Sochocki Zentralblatt profile

Number theorists
Saint Petersburg State University alumni
Russian people of Polish descent
Scientists from Warsaw
Polish mathematicians
19th-century mathematicians from the Russian Empire
20th-century Russian mathematicians
1842 births
1927 deaths